Saint-Jean-de-la-Neuville is a commune in the Seine-Maritime department in the Normandy region in northern France.

Geography
Junction 7 of the A29 autoroute with the D910 road is entirely within the borders of the commune.

Population

Places of interest
 The church of St.Jean, dating from the sixteenth century.
 The ruins of a sixteenth-century chateau.

See also
Communes of the Seine-Maritime department

References

Communes of Seine-Maritime